ShaGasyia "Shea" Diamond (born March 17, 1978) is an American singer, songwriter, and transgender rights activist. Her music is chiefly soul and R&B, and includes elements of blues, rock, hip-hop and folk. Her songwriting ability has been described as "demonstrating a rare gift to portray raw, dynamic emotion in a way that moves the body as much as the spirit" Her influences include Whitney Houston and Tina Turner.

Her debut extended play Seen It All was released on June 29, 2018.

Early life
Diamond was born in Little Rock, Arkansas to a fourteen-year-old mother and was raised by relatives in Memphis, Tennessee before living most of her teenage years and adulthood in Flint, Michigan. She ran away from home at age fourteen and spent time in the foster care system before getting emancipated at seventeen. Growing up she felt immense pressure to act masculine, despite knowing early on that she identified as a woman. She was inspired to become a singer by Tina Turner and worked on her skills while directing her church choir, where she was often chastised for singing too high. At age 20 she robbed a convenience store at gunpoint to pay for gender affirmation surgery. Diamond was in and out of men's correctional facilities in Michigan between 1999 and 2009. It was in prison that she wrote her song "I Am Her." While incarcerated, Diamond faced discrimination specifically for her identity as a trans woman. She was kept in protective segregation and lost privileges often to keep her away from the male population. Humiliation, isolation, and misgendering were used as punishment.

Career
After watching a video of Diamond performing her song "I Am Her" a cappella at a Trans Lives Matter rally, pop songwriter Justin Tranter was so impressed by her honesty and raw vocal talent that they immediately got in contact with her and they began recording music together. Tranter went on to co-sign her to Asylum Records and executive produce and co-write her debut extended play Seen It All, released on June 29, 2018.

In 2017, Diamond covered "I'd Love to Change the World" by the English rock band Ten Years After for the television miniseries When We Rise. In December 2018 Diamond joined the Human Rights Campaign's Equality Rocks campaign.

In February 2019 she was nominated for the GLAAD Media Award for Outstanding Music Artist. The same year her song "American Pie" was endorsed by 2020 United States presidential candidate Pete Buttigieg and used in his campaign rallies.  In June 2019 she was a headliner for the Washington, DC Capital Pride Concert On June 7, 2019 Diamond released her single "Don't Shoot", a song that was described by Paper as containing "a message against America's ongoing gun violence epidemic while also being a reflection Diamond's experience [sic] as a Black trans woman who has been incarcerated and systemically discriminated against".

Diamond's hand appeared on the original cover of Sam Smith's third studio album, back when it was known as To Die For. She also appears in the music video for their song "I'm Ready" with Demi Lovato.

Diamond's song "I Am America" provides the theme song for the HBO series We're Here. The song was released as a single on April 23, 2020. "I Am America" was included on Billboards list of the best LGBTQ songs of 2020 Also in 2020, she released the singles "Stand Up" and "So Lucky", and had two songs appear on the soundtrack to the Hulu original Christmas film Happiest Season.

Discography

Extended plays

Singles

As lead artist

As featured artist

Other appearances

References

External links 
 Shea Diamond on Twitter
Shea Diamond on Instagram
Shea Diamond on Apple Music

Living people
1978 births
American LGBT singers
American LGBT songwriters
American soul singers
Transgender women musicians
LGBT people from Arkansas
LGBT people from Tennessee
LGBT African Americans
Musicians from Little Rock, Arkansas
Musicians from Memphis, Tennessee
Asylum Records artists
American people convicted of robbery
American LGBT rights activists
Transgender rights activists
East West Records artists
Transgender singers
Transgender songwriters
American transgender writers